The broad-billed sandpiper (Calidris falcinellus) is a small wading bird. The scientific name is from Latin. The specific name  falcinella is from falx, falcis, "a  sickle. Some research suggests that it should rather go into the genus Philomachus.

Description 

Broad-billed sandpipers are small waders, slightly smaller than the dunlin, but with a longer straighter bill, and shorter legs. The breeding adult has patterned dark grey upperparts and white underparts with blackish markings on the breast. It has a pale crown stripe and supercilia.

In the boreal winter, they are pale grey above and white below, like a winter dunlin, but retaining the head pattern. Juveniles have backs, similar to young dunlin, but the white flanks and belly and brown-streaked breast are distinctive.

Contact call is a dry, whistling “dree-it, dree-it” and a clicking “dik dik”.

Distribution and habitat 

The broad-billed sandpiper is strongly migratory, spending the non-breeding season from easternmost Africa, through south and south-east Asia to Australasia. It is highly gregarious, and will form flocks with other calidrid waders, particularly dunlins. Despite its European breeding range, this species is rare on passage in western Europe, presumably because of the south-easterly migration route.

This bird's breeding habitat is wet taiga bogs in Arctic northern Europe and Siberia. The male performs an aerial display during courtship. They nest in a ground scrape, laying 4 eggs.

They forage in soft mud on marshes and the coast, mainly picking up food by sight. They mostly eat insects and other small invertebrates.

The broad-billed sandpiper is one of the species to which the Agreement on the Conservation of African-Eurasian Migratory Waterbirds (AEWA) applies.

References

External links

 Oiseaux Photos
 
 
 
 
 
 
 
 

Wading birds
broad-billed sandpiper
Birds of Scandinavia
Birds of North Asia
broad-billed sandpiper
broad-billed sandpiper